The 2010 United States Senate election in Washington was held on November 2, 2010 alongside other elections to the United States Senate in other states as well as elections to the United States House of Representatives and various state and local elections. Incumbent Democratic U.S. Senator Patty Murray won re-election to a fourth term by a margin of 52.1% – 47.4% over Republican Dino Rossi, who had twice run for governor in 2004 and 2008. , this was the last U.S. Senate election in Washington in which the margin of victory was within single digits.

Top-two primary election

Candidates

Democrats 
 Patty Murray, incumbent U.S. Senator
 Charles Allen
 Bob Burr

Republicans 
 Dino Rossi, former State Senator and gubernatorial candidate
 Paul Akers, salesman
 William Chovil
 Clint Didier, former NFL football player
 Norma Gruber
 Michael Latimer

Others 
 Will Baker (Reform Party)
 Schalk Leonard
 Skip Mercer, professor
 Mohammad Said (Centrist Party)

Polling

Results

General election

Candidates 
The top 2 candidates from the blanket primary advanced to the general election.

 Patty Murray (D), incumbent U.S. Senator
 Dino Rossi (R), former State Senator and gubernatorial candidate

Campaign 
Rossi heavily criticized Murray for her support of the 2009 economic stimulus package; however, Rossi's economic promises are nearly identical to those of President Bush who asked for the stimulus. Rossi supports repealing the Patient Protection and Affordable Care Act and the Dodd-Frank Wall Street Reform and Consumer Protection Act. He also criticized Murray for her support for earmarks. In response, Murray said, "You bet that seniority and leadership has a big thing to do with it, but the other part of it is, I get up every day and I work hard and I believe in this and I am going to continue fighting for the community I represent."

The National Rifle Association spent $414,100 supporting Rossi and opposing Murray in the 2010 senatorial contest.

Debates 
Rossi offered six debates, five of which would be in-state and one nationally. Murray agreed to two debates, and only two debates were held.

 Seattle on KOMO-TV.
 Spokane on KSPS-TV and KXLY-TV.

Predictions

Polling 
Aggregate polls

Results 
Murray defeated Rossi by about 114,000 votes. King County, the home of Seattle, likely gave Murray a victory.

Fundraising

Notes

References

External links 
 Elections and Voting at the Washington Secretary of State
 U.S. Congress candidates for Washington at Project Vote Smart
 Campaign contributions from Open Secrets
 2010 Washington Senate General Election: All Head-to-Head Matchups graph of multiple polls from Pollster.com
 Election 2010: Washington Senate from Rasmussen Reports
 2010 Washington Senate Race from Real Clear Politics
 2010 Washington Senate Race from CQ Politics
 Race profile from The New York Times
 Editorial board endorsement interview: Senate 2010 from The Seattle Times

Official campaign websites (Archived)
 Patty Murray for U.S. Senate incumbent
 Dino Rossi for U.S. Senate

2010 Washington (state) elections
Washington
2010